House at 73 Grove Street is a historic home located at Lynbrook in Nassau County, New York. It was built about 1840 and is a -story, clapboard-sided dwelling with a side-gabled roof.  It was originally one room deep and two rooms wide, but expanded to two rooms deep in the 1930s. It has a two-story rear extension. It features a three-bay, single-story Colonial Revival style porch with four square support posts.

It was listed on the National Register of Historic Places in 2008.

References

Houses on the National Register of Historic Places in New York (state)
Colonial Revival architecture in New York (state)
Houses completed in 1840
Houses in Nassau County, New York
National Register of Historic Places in Nassau County, New York